is a Japanese television drama that ran on Fuji Television every Thursday at 10:00 to 10:54 PM from July 6 to September 14, 2000. Its opening theme is "Pomp and Circumstance Marches No. 1", performed by the London Philharmonic Orchestra.

The complete DVD boxset was released on April 20, 2010.

Plot
Tomashi village is a small village, well known for its abundance of nature and beautiful surroundings. When a development company called Funamushi plans to build an industrial waste treatment facility in the area, the villagers are unhappy with the effects it will have on the environment, and seek an injunction. The village chief goes to Tokyo and finds a young lawyer to represent them in court, the one lawyer in the city who has actually lived in the village. The man, however, knows of the company's crafty lawyer, Tanomo Aboshi...

Tarō Akihito, a once highly renowned actor who happens to play a lawyer in a TV drama, is mistaken for a real lawyer by the villagers in a freak coincidence. He finally works up his courage to begin the fight, and they convince him to represent them.

Cast
Kōji Yakusho as Tarō Akihito
Shingo Katori as Tadashi Daiyama
Kyōka Suzuki as Shino Inuzuka
Masahiko Tsugawa as Tanomo Aboshi
Kunie Tanaka as Moritaka Inuzuka
Akira Terao as Teīchirō Kotoidani
Jun Kunimura as Kagetora Anzai
Akio Kaneda as Kakukura Kamoda
Kōichi Yamadera as Chikō Keno
Zen Kajiwara as Gisuke Kawakita
Narushi Ikeda as Teizō Kotoidani
Akaji Maro as Kingo Tenba
Toshiya Tōyama as Asao Seta
Kenji Matsutani as Hachirō Hayashi
Hajime Inoue as Michio Daiyama
Kōta Ishii as Yoshikichi Yamane
Nanae Akasawa as Otoya Miyata
Yōichi Nukumizu as Hikita
Midoriko Kimura as Naoko Satō
Kazuko Shirakawa as Setsuko Daiyama
Toshiaki Karasawa as Kazushige Hatoyama
Norito Yashima as Rei Saitō
Naoki Sugiura as Kazutaka Akaiwa

Staff
Planning: Takashi Ishihara
Writer: Kōki Mitani
Director: Shunsaku Kawake, Daisuke Tajima, Takayoshi Nakayama
Music: Takayuki Hattori
Producer: Ken Hatano, Jun Shimoyama

Episode list

Averate ratings 11.2%

References

External links
Aikotoba wa Yūki at Fuji TV's official site

2000 Japanese television series debuts
2000 Japanese television series endings
Japanese drama television series
Fuji TV dramas
Television shows written by Kôki Mitani